The Man Without Gravity is a 2019 Italian modern fairy tale with magic realism style. Directed and written by Marco Bonfanti and starring Elio Germano, Michela Cescon and Elena Cotta, the film was released on November 1, 2019 on Netflix.

Plot
The plot of the film revolves around the child Oscar (Elio Germano) who, when being born, flies away lighter than a balloon. 

Oscar comes to light on a stormy night, in the hospital of a small town, and immediately we understand that there is something extraordinary about him : he does not obey the law of gravity. He floats in the air, hovers in the lightest breeze like a balloon, in front of the incredulous look of the mother and grandmother. The child grows closely protected and sheltered - with only one friend, a little girl called Agata who knows his secret. When nosy neighbours cause the police to step in and request that Oscar be sent to school with all the other children, the two women decide to move to a remote village to keep him safe. Surrounded by books, Oscar grows up in this little village until the day he decides that the whole world must know who he really is. He is "The Man without Gravity" .

Cast
 Elio Germano as Oscar
 Michela Cescon as Natalia
 Elena Cotta as Alina
 Silvia D'Amico as Agata
 Vincent Scarito as David
 Pietro Pescara as Young Oscar
 Jennifer Brokshi as Young Agata
 Andrea Pennacchi as Andrea
 Cristina Donadio as Lucy
 Dieter-Michael Grohmann as Lukas
 Dominique Lombardo as Piero
 Francesco Procopio as Marshal
 Salvio Simeoli as TV Presenter
 Agnieszka Jania as Vlady
 Balkissa Souley Maiga as Sissy

Release
The Man Without Gravity was released on November 1, 2019 on Netflix.

References

External links
 
 
 

2019 films
2010s Italian-language films
2019 comedy-drama films
Italian comedy-drama films
Italian-language Netflix original films
2019 comedy films
2010s Italian films